Ko Phra Thong is an island in Khura Buri District, Phang Nga Province, southern Thailand on the Andaman Sea.

Ko Phra Thong is the middle link in a chain of three islands. It is largely flat with expanses of inland savanna. It has long uninhabited beaches, fringed by coconut palms. There have always been a number of special natural features of Ko Phra Thong Island. All are renowned diving locations.

On the east side is a small fisher village, Thapayoi, and on the southeast end is another small village, Thung Dap. These villages total fewer than 300 inhabitants consisting of Moken, a tribe of sea gypsies, and Thais. The larger village, Thapayoi, has a school and a community health centre. 

To the north is Ko Ra. It is long, mountainous, and covered in rain forest. The island is home to a number of animal species. 

To the south is Ko Kho Khao which is similar to Ko Phra Tong.

The island is part of the Mu Ko Ra–Ko Phra Thong National Park, established in 2001.

References

External links

Islands of Thailand
Geography of Phang Nga province
Ramsar sites in Thailand